Marion Frances Robinson  (née Harrison; 9 November 1923 – 25 February 2003) was a New Zealand nutritionist and physiologist. She was professor of nutrition at the University of Otago, and is particularly noted for her investigation of the importance of selenium in the human diet.

Early life and family
Robinson was born on 9 November 1923, the daughter of Wilfred, a carpenter, and Gladys Harrison. She was educated at Wellington Girls' College and "did well despite a hostile headmistress".

Academic career
Robinson completed a Bachelor of Home Science degree at the University of Otago in May 1945, and followed it immediately with a Master of Home Science degree, graduating in December 1945. Robinson received the Anna P. Stout Scholarship for her Master's research. At that time Home Science was the only way of studying biochemistry outside of a medical degree. Robinson studied the fluorine in dental enamel for her Master's degree, having been introduced to the study of trace elements by Muriel Bell.

Robinson moved to the University of Cambridge to work with Professor Robert McCance. She completed a PhD and from 1949 to 1957 was assistant director of research in the Department of Experimental Medicine.

While in Cambridge, Robinson published on the physiology of rat livers. Robinson married James Roper Robinson, a physiologist, in 1951 in Cambridge. Robinson returned to New Zealand with her family in 1957.

Robinson's research focused on trace elements and human nutrition. She set up the first trace element laboratory for the School of Home Sciences at the University of Otago, and became internationally renowned for her work on selenium. In 1980, she became a full professor, with the award of a personal chair in nutrition. In 1985, she worked on the World Health Organisation task group on selenium. She served as the head of the Department of Human Nutrition at Otago between 1985 and 1988, and was conferred with the title of professor emeritus when she retired in 1989.

Death
Robinson died in Dunedin on 25 February 2003, and she is commemorated by a plaque in the Court of Reflections at Andersons Bay Cemetery. She was survived by her husband and twin daughters, who both held doctorates themselves. Her husband died in 2007.

Honours and awards
Robinson was elected a Fellow of the Royal Society of New Zealand in 1978, and a Fellow of New Zealand Institute of Chemistry in 1976. In 1988 she was awarded the prestigious McCollum Award by the American Society for Clinical Nutrition. Following her retirement from Otago, she was appointed a Commander of the Order of the British Empire, for services to nutrition education and research, in the 1990 New Year Honours. Also in 1990, she was awarded honorary life membership of the New Zealand Dietetic Association / Dietitians New Zealand.

In 2017 Robinson was selected as one of the Royal Society Te Apārangi's 150 women in 150 words.

Selected works

References

1923 births
2003 deaths
New Zealand women academics
University of Otago alumni
Alumni of the University of Cambridge
Academic staff of the University of Otago
New Zealand physiologists
Women nutritionists
Fellows of the Royal Society of New Zealand
New Zealand Commanders of the Order of the British Empire
New Zealand women scientists
Fellows of the New Zealand Institute of Chemistry
People educated at Wellington Girls' College
New Zealand expatriates in England